= 1986 Liechtenstein citizenship referendum =

- 7 December 1986
- Referendum on a proposal on acquiring and losing citizenship

Results
Choice	Votes	%
Yes	4,874	52.04%
No	4,492	47.96%
Valid votes	9,366	94.27%
Invalid or blank votes	569	5.73%
Total votes	9,935	100.00%
Registered voters/turnout	12,636	78.62%

A referendum on citizenship was held in Liechtenstein on 7 December 1986. Voters were asked whether they approved of a proposal on acquiring and losing citizenship. It was approved by 52.0% of voters.

== Results ==
Choice	Votes	%
For	4,874	52.0
Against	4,492	48.0
Invalid/blank votes	569	–
Total	9,935	100
Registered voters/turnout	12,636	78.6
Source: Nohlen & Stöver
